MRS, Mrs, or mrs may refer to:

 Magnetic resonance spectroscopy
 Mandibular repositioning splint
 Marginal rate of substitution, in economics
 Maritime Reaction Squadron of the South African Navy
 Market Research Society
 Marseille Provence Airport (IATA airport code)
 Materials Research Society
 Melbourne Rectangular Stadium
 Minimal recursion semantics
 Modified Rankin Scale, to measure disability after stroke
 Monks Risborough railway station, England (National Rail station code)
 Movimiento Renovador Sandinista, a political party in Nicaragua, see Sandinista Renovation Movement
 Mrs., an honorific title for married women
 MRS Logística, a freight rail company in Brazil
 MRS suit, breathing apparatus, see Siebe Gorman#Rebreather equipment
 SQL Server Reporting Services, a Microsoft Reporting Services computer technology to create data reports
 MRS agar, a bacterial growth medium for Lactobacilli
 mrs, abbreviation for maravedis (monetary unit or coin)
 M.R.S. (Most Requested Show), Filipino TV show
 (As Mrş) abbreviation for Mareşal, the highest rank in the Army of Turkey
M. Rs., pen-name of Swedish writer Mathilda Roos (1852-1908)
 The Mrs, U.S. pop-rock band
Molecular Recognition Section as a Drug prefix, e.g. MRS5698.

See also

 
 Missus (disambiguation)
 Miss (disambiguation)
 MR (disambiguation)
 MS (disambiguation)